Yeldham is an English surname. Notable people with the surname include:

 Florence Yeldham (1877–1945), British school teacher and historian of arithmetic
 Peter Yeldham (1927–2022), Australian screenwriter
 Ronald Yeldham (1902–1983), Indian born cricketer

English-language surnames